West Kootenay-Rossland was an electoral district in the Canadian province of British Columbia from 1898 to 1903.

Demographics

Geography

History

Notable MLAs

References 
Electoral History of BC 1871-1986, Elections BC

Former provincial electoral districts of British Columbia